King of the Slavs was a title denoting some Slavic rulers, as well as Germanic rulers that conquered Slavs, in the Middle Ages in European sources, such as Papal correspondence.

Papal use is bolded.

Slavic

Samo, ruler of Slavs (623–658); in the Frankish Annals
Drogoviz, ruler of the Veleti (789); in Annales Mettenses priores in  805
Trpimir I, ruler of Croatia (845–864); erroneously by Gottschalk in the 840s
Svatopluk I of Moravia, ruler of Moravia (870–894); by Pope Stephen V in 885
Michael, ruler of Zahumlje (913–926); erroneously in the Annales Barenses
Mihailo Vojislavljević, ruler of Duklja (1050–1081); by Pope Gregory VII in 1077
Bodin Vojislavljević, ruler of Duklja (1081–1101); by the chronicle of Orderic Vitalis, relating to events of 1096
Stefan Dragutin, ruler of Serbia (1276–1282) and Syrmia (1282–1316); by Pope Nicholas IV in 1288

Non-Slavic
Canute Lavard, Danish prince (1120–1131); by Abbott Wilhelm after 1129

See also
King of the Wends

References

Sources
 
 

Slavic history
European kings